A PIND test is a Particle Impact Noise Detection test.

According to method 2020.9 of MIL-STD-883 and method 2052.5 of MIL-STD-750, the purpose of a PIND test is to detect loose particles inside an electronics device cavity. The test provides a nondestructive means of identifying those devices containing particles of sufficient mass that, upon impact within the cavity, excite the transducer.

References

Nondestructive testing